Madrid Agreement can refer to:

 Madrid system, the international system to facilitate the registration of trademarks
 Madrid Accords, a 1975 treaty to end the Spanish presence in Spanish Sahara
 Protocol on Environmental Protection to the Antarctic Treaty, or the Madrid Protocol, part of the Antarctic Treaty System